Overdrive (James Beverley) is a fictional villain, appearing in American comic books published by Marvel Comics. The character is usually depicted as an enemy of Spider-Man.

Publication history
Created by Dan Slott and Phil Jimenez, Overdrive first appeared in Amazing Spider-Man: Swing Shift (May 2007), a Free Comic Book Day issue set after the events of the Spider-Man: One More Day storyline.

Something of a throwaway joke character, Overdrive made a few inconsequential appearances throughout Dan Slott's run on The Amazing Spider-Man. As part of Marvel NOW! and the Superior Spider-Man relaunch, Overdrive joined the Sinister Six and featured as one of the main characters in Superior Foes of Spider-Man.

Fictional character biography
James Beverley is a race car driver who had dreams of being a superhero. When every attempt failed and he ended up in an accident, he gained the assistance of Power Broker. Mister Negative approached him and offered him a job in his criminal organization.

Overdrive was hired by Mister Negative to steal an artifact from a museum, but was unable to deliver it because of interference from Spider-Man. Overdrive led Spider-Man on a high-speed chase through the streets of Manhattan. When Spider-Man smashed the windshield of Overdrive's car, it revealed dozens of pieces of Spider-Man-related merchandise such as bobble-heads, air-fresheners, and action figures. Overdrive declared that he was Spider-Man's "biggest fan", even asking for an autograph as Spider-Man was trying to stop him.

The chase finally culminated in a car-wreck that had Overdrive and his vehicle hanging from a bridge in New York by Spider-Man's webbing with Spider-Man's trademark note, "Courtesy of your friendly neighborhood Spider-Man". Overdrive asked the police who were on the scene to arrest him if he could keep the note. Overdrive was then sent by Mister Negative to steal the Sonic Pulse Generator from a laboratory but he failed again when he met Spider-Man once again. Mister Negative told his men to dispose of Overdrive and they put him in the trunk of Mister Negative's limo and Overdrive was able to escape them by converting the limo into one of his "tricked out" cars.

Ever since Lily Hollister's baby was stolen by the Chameleon, Spider-Man had been going on a rampage against any villains involved. The police recovered a web ball containing Overdrive, Spot, and Diablo.

Peter Parker later sees Overdrive kidnapping Terri Hilman, the daughter of a powerful socialite. Since his costume is dirty after the battle with Doctor Octopus, Peter is forced to use a Halloween Spider-Man costume. Overdrive transforms the limousine he is driving into a copy of the Spider-Mobile. He then shoots Peter with webs pinning him into a wall. However, Peter manages to take Overdrive out from the car and leave him hanging for the police.

While working for Kingpin, Overdrive fought Black Panther.

As part of the "Marvel NOW!," Overdrive was hired by Boomerang to be a part of his version of the Sinister Six. Overdrive stole the original Big Wheel vehicle and upgraded it through his powers. However, the Superior Spider-Man (Doctor Octopus' mind in Peter Parker's body) defeated Overdrive and the rest of the Sinister Six using a power dampening field that caused Overdrive's nano-bacteria to shut down. Overdrive features as one of the main characters in Superior Foes of Spider-Man. He secretly admitted that he only became a villain to gain a reputation, then planned to convert to the good side like Hawkeye.

The new Hijacker that fought Ant-Man and Captain America in Miami claimed that his superpowers were derived from nanites that he acquired in New York from "some washout called Overdrive."

Overdrive later worked for Mister Negative again and became a getaway driver for his henchmen. Following a bank heist, Overdrive drove the Inner Demons away from the police. When one of the Inner Demons activated a weapon in Overdrive's car to use on the police, Overdrive continued to drive to the safehouse. While in their safehouse, the Inner Demons were attacked by a revived Sin-Eater. Overdrive took his car and drove away wishing that his attacker was Punisher. Overdrive raced for three days trying to avoid Sin-Eater. On the day where Spider-Man's dream predicted his death, Overdrive found Spider-Man and asked for his protection only to be shot by Sin-Eater. Carlie Cooper examined his body in the morgue when Overdrive somehow returned to life and found no bodily damages on him. Due to Sin-Eater having taken away his powers, Overdrive was placed on life support as Carlie keeps an eye on him. Following a fight with the Lethal Legion at Empire State University, Spider-Man wonders how Overdrive can be in critical condition while everyone else that Sin-Eater "cleansed" were sent to Ravencroft. James explained to Carly what happened to him and began to feel sorrow for the actions that he caused. Some police officers later checked on James and nearly beat him to death only for Carlie to stop them. James was put on life support as Carlie informs Spider-Man on what happened to James.

Following Sin-Eater's suicide which caused those that he purged of their sins to regain them, James Beverley recovered and encountered Carlie Cooper while working as a taxi driver. When he invites Carlie to dinner, James revealed that he made bad choices in his life when he wanted to be a good guy. James drives her to the nearest coffeehouse.

Powers and abilities
Overdrive scatters nanites by touch which can transform a vehicle to his will such as improving a car's speed or design. These changes will revert if Overdrive is away from the vehicle for too long, and his powers don't work of he gets too "excited". In one case he was able to turn a vehicle into a copy of the spider-mobile.

In other media
 Overdrive appears in the Spider-Man episode "Bring on the Bad Guys" Pt. 1, voiced by Ryan Blaney.
 A female Marvel 2099-inspired incarnation of Overdrive appears in the Nintendo DS version of Spider-Man: Edge of Time, voiced by Kari Wahlgren. She wears a nanite-based costume and is more competent than her mainstream counterpart, claiming she only commits crimes for the speed.

References

External links
 Overdrive at Marvel Wiki
 Overdrive at Comic Vine
 

Characters created by Dan Slott
Comics characters introduced in 2007
Fictional drivers
Fictional henchmen
Fictional racing drivers
Spider-Man characters